Jradzor is a village in the Amasia Municipality of the Shirak Province of Armenia. It is a part of the Amasia rural community. It is located on the right bank of the Hoghmajur or Illiget River, a tributary of the Akhuryan.

Etymology 
The village was previously known as Jalab. It was renamed Jradzor in 1946.

History 
An old church and cemetery, as well as the remains of a fortification dating back to the second or first millennium BCE, are located in the village. Traces of a settlement dating back to the third millennium BCE have been discovered near the village school, including a large quantity of potter fragments and vessels. Tombs from the classical period were also unearthed in the same area, which appear to have been destroyed during the Middle Ages. In 1967, a large diatomite mine was discovered near the village. 

As in many other settlements in Shirak Province, part of the village's population are descended from Armenians who migrated from the Western Armenian province of Basen in the nineteenth century. Jradzor was damaged during the 1988 Armenian earthquake.

During Soviet times, the village was included within the Amasia District of the Armenian SSR. In 1995 it became a part of Shirak Province and was later included in the Amasia rural community (municipality).

Demographics
The population of the village since 1831 is as follows:

References 

Populated places in Shirak Province